Naturewatch Foundation, founded in 1991 by the late John Ruane, is a registered charity in the UK. Their mission is to "end animal cruelty and advance animal welfare standards around the world".

Naturewatch Foundation run animal welfare campaigns within the United Kingdom, most notably campaigns against animal experiments, puppy farming and badger baiting, as well as running stray animal welfare programmes in Ukraine. They have published The Compassionate Shopping Guide regularly since 1993, endorsing cruelty-free cosmetic and household product brands. They claim to operate the world's strictest endorsement criteria for cruelty-free companies, insisting on a fixed cut-off date animal testing policy for both brands and parent companies.

They have sponsored the World Animal Day movement since 2003.

Patrons
 Alexandra Bastedo
 Princess Elisabeth de Croÿ
 Rula Lenska
 Hayley Mills
 Chris Packham
 Pollyanna Pickering
 Jenny Seagrove
 Anneka Svenska
 Wendy Turner Webster

References

External links
 

Charities based in England